Lao is a village in Tõstamaa Parish, Pärnu County, in southwestern Estonia. It is located on the top of the Tõstamaa peninsula, on the coast of the Gulf of Riga. Lao has a population of 31 as of 1 January 2011.

Munalaiu harbour, which connects the islands Kihnu and Manilaid with the mainland, is located in Lao.

References 

Villages in Pärnu County